Rebelde Way is an Argentine telenovela created and produced by Cris Morena. It was originally broadcast on Azul Televisiónfrom 27 May 2002 to 10 November 2003. The soap opera has been broadcast in many countries, achieving widespread success.

Rebelde Way is set in the Elite Way School, a prestigious private boarding high school near Buenos Aires. The students are the members of Argentina's wealthiest families, as well as gifted students with scholarships. The series follows the lives of the students, their parents and their professors, and it also features the regular use of English language and phrases by the upper class. Its central characters are Marizza Pía Spirito, Mía Colucci, Pablo Bustamante and Manuel Aguirre, portrayed by, respectively, Camila Bordonaba, Luisana Lopilato, Benjamín Rojas and Felipe Colombo. The four form a band named Erreway, in order to pursue their dreams. The band enjoyed great success in Argentina, Spain, Greece, Cyprus and Israel, selling close 2 million records and achieving several platinum records. As well as a series of merchandising, Cris Morena Group also released a spin-off movie, Erreway: 4 Caminos (Erreway: 4 Roads), in 2004. The adult protagonists are Catherine Fulop, Martin Seefeld, Susana Ortíz y Fernán Mirás. The antagonists are Boy Olmi, Pablo Heredia, Inés Palombo, Gimena Accardi, Mariano Bertolini and Adriana Salonia.

Plot summary

Season 1 (2002)
The Elite Way School is an internationally prestigious private secondary boarding school. For this reason, the regulation is very demanding. In the morning, the students take classes, and in the afternoons they dedicate themselves to improvement workshops, sports and the hectic social life of teenagers. The students are mostly children of the richest families in the country, and other scholars. The latter discriminated against by the former, and in the sights of a secret organization which wants them out of the school, which the teachers believe fictitious. Despite the differences and fights that exist between Marizza Pía Spirito (Camila Bordonaba), Mía Colucci (Luisana Lopilato), Manuel Aguirre (Felipe Colombo) and Pablo Bustamante (Benjamín Rojas), they manage to form a band in secret from their parents and school, given that the only thing they have in common is the love of music.

Season 2 (2003)
The third graders are now in fourth grade. New students are joining the Elite Way School. They are: Laura (Muni Seligmann), Dolores (Lis Moreno), Sol (Inés Palombo), Francisco (Francisco Bass) and Rocco (Piru Sáez). Among the teachers, Carmen Menéndez, a literature teacher and former student of the Elite Way School, where she always felt discriminated against because of her lack of beauty. Marizza, for her part, manages to channel her rebellion into a solidarity task, thanks to the appearance of Martín Andrade (Miguel Cherutti), a new teacher who makes her believe in herself. The band, still together,  are not content with singing in hiding. The feeling for the group to exist and prosper is so strong that they fight for it with utmost motivation. They soon realize that the "outside" is not the strongest enemy, what threatens the union of the group are themselves. In the midst of this reality, these young people must face and survive the most difficult battle: that of forging their destiny and achieving their dreams without ceasing to be themselves.

Cast and characters

Erreway 

Erreway was an Argentine band formed during the television series Rebelde Way, consisting of Camila Bordonaba, Felipe Colombo and Benjamín Rojas. Originally, it consisted of Bordonaba, Colombo, Rojas and Luisana Lopilato, who left the group in 2005. They released three studio albums – Señales, Tiempo and Memoria.

International broadcast

Awards and nominations 
 2003 — Martín Fierro Award for Best Telenovela — nomination

Film sequel

International remakes 
The format has been sold in various countries across the globe and numerous remakes of Rebelde Way have been made. In 2003, the Spanish public broadcaster TVE bought the rights to adapt the show. It did not go into production because of disagreements between the executives and Cris Morena Group. Also in 2003, Destiny, an independent company in Brazil, bought the rights and produced a pilot but it was not picked up by any network.

According to Cris Morena, the first country to buy the format was India, there they produced the history under the name Remix. Produced by Rose Audio Visuals, it was broadcast on the Star One channel. A hit among teenagers, it has returned on the same channel. In 2008, a Portuguese version of the same name was made by the SIC channel. Its first season started in September, but the second season was cancelled due to poor ratings. Corazón Rebelde is the Chilean remake of the show that was broadcast from August 2009 on Canal 13 with the name of S.O.S. and "Corazón Rebelde" as the slogan. Two weeks after the start of the show the name was changed to its previous title. It has had a good reception since it was released.In 2008, a Greek version  was made by the Alpha TV channel.The unique season of the series ended in the summer of 2009.The title was called Γ4
  – Rebelde (2004–2006)
  – Remix (2004–2006)
  – Rebelde Way (2008–2009)
  – Corazón rebelde (2009)
  – Rebelde (2011–2012)
  – Γ4 (2008–2009)
  – Rebelde (2022)

References 

2002 telenovelas
2002 Argentine television series debuts
2004 Argentine television series endings
Argentine telenovelas
Spanish-language telenovelas
Television shows set in Argentina
Musical telenovelas
Children's telenovelas
Teen telenovelas
Television series about fictional musicians
Television series about teenagers
Television shows set in Buenos Aires
El Nueve original programming
América TV original programming